Edward John O'Brien (born 15 April 1968) is an English guitarist, songwriter and member of the rock band Radiohead. He releases solo music under the name EOB.

O'Brien attended Abingdon School in Oxfordshire, England, where he met the other members of Radiohead. O'Brien said his role in the group was to "service the songs" and support the songwriter, Thom Yorke. He often creates ambient sounds and textures, using effects, sustain units and the EBow, and provides backing vocals. In 2010, Rolling Stone named O'Brien the 59th-greatest guitarist of all time. Along with the other members of Radiohead, he was inducted into the Rock and Roll Hall of Fame in 2019.

O'Brien's first solo album, Earth, was released in 2020. O'Brien had been writing songs for years, but lacked confidence and felt they had a character that would be lost with Radiohead. He began a North American tour in February 2020; a larger tour was cancelled due to the COVID-19 pandemic.

Early life 

O'Brien was born on April 15, 1968. His family comes from Ballyporeen, Ireland. As a child, O'Brien enjoyed cricket and theatre. His parents split when he was 10; O'Brien said this was when music became his "refuge". He grew up listening to post-punk acts such as Siouxsie and the Banshees, Adam and the Ants, Depeche Mode, the Police and David Bowie. He said: "It was a very foetal [time] for music because people who went to art college or artists, or musicians, suddenly thought, 'Oh, I can be that.'"

The members of Radiohead met while attending Abingdon School, an independent school for boys in Abingdon, Oxfordshire. While O'Brien was playing Lysander in a school production of A Midsummer Night's Dream, he met Thom Yorke, who was scoring the production. Yorke asked him to join him for a jam. According to O'Brien, "Before that, [life] was a bit confusing, a bit crap. And then suddenly ... I felt something very strong, almost like some kind of epiphany, almost like: 'This is it.'"

O'Brien, along with the drummer Philip Selway, was in the year above Yorke and the bassist Colin Greenwood, and three years above Colin's brother, the multi-instrumentalist Jonny Greenwood. In 1985, they formed On a Friday, the name referring to the band's usual rehearsal day in the school's music room. The band continued to rehearse during holidays while the members attended university. O'Brien studied economics at the University of Manchester.

Career

Radiohead 
In 1991, On a Friday signed a record contract with EMI and changed their name to Radiohead. They found early success with their debut 1992 single "Creep". Their third album, OK Computer (1997), brought them international fame and is often acclaimed as one of the best albums of all time. OK Computer saw O'Brien use less distortion and more delay and other effects, creating a sound that was "more about textures". O'Brien became depressed during the extensive OK Computer tour, but focused on supporting Yorke. After the tour, he returned to Oxford, used large amounts of drugs and fell further into depression. He said: "I was single, on my own … I was the lowest I've ever been. It was the irony as well – you're at the top, that old cliché."

Radiohead's next albums, Kid A (2000) and Amnesiac (2001), marked a dramatic change in sound, incorporating influences from electronic music, classical music, jazz and krautrock. O'Brien initially struggled with the change of direction, saying: "It's scary – everyone feels insecure. I'm a guitarist and suddenly it's like, well, there are no guitars on this track, or no drums." At the suggestion of Michael Brook, the creator of the Infinite Guitar, O'Brien began using sustain units, which allow guitar notes to be sustained indefinitely. He combined these with looping and delay effects to create synthesiser-like sounds. O'Brien kept an online diary of Radiohead's progress during the recording.

By 2011, Radiohead had sold more than 30 million albums worldwide. They were inducted into the Rock and Roll Hall of Fame in March 2019; O'Brien and the Radiohead drummer Philip Selway attended the induction ceremony and gave speeches. O'Brien thanked his bandmates for their musicianship and friendship, saying that "some of the nights we have in the rehearsal studio where they’re like transcendental moments".

Solo work 
O'Brien releases solo music under the name EOB. After making demos with the producer Ian Davenport in 2014, he recorded with the producer Flood from late 2017 to early 2019. His first solo track, the ambient composition "Santa Teresa", was released on 4 October, 2019. He had written songs for years, but lacked the confidence to bring them to Radiohead and felt they had a "distinct energy" that would be lost if they became a "hybrid product".

O'Brien's debut solo album, Earth, was released on 17 April 2020 on Capitol Records to positive reviews. It features the drummer Omar Hakim, the Invisible members Nathan East and Dave Okumu, the folk singer Laura Marling, the Portishead guitarist Adrian Utley, the Wilco drummer Glenn Kotche and the Radiohead bassist Colin Greenwood. The music was inspired by O'Brien's time living in Brazil and attending Carnival, which he described as a "musical eureka moment". The first track, "Brasil", was released on 5 December 2019, followed by "Shangri-La" on 6 February. O'Brien began a North American tour in February 2020; a larger Earth tour was cancelled due to the COVID-19 pandemic. O'Brien contributed a remix of Paul McCartney's song "Slidin'" to the remix album McCartney III Imagined (2021).

Other work 

In 1999, O'Brien contributed to the soundtrack for the BBC drama series Eureka Street. He played guitar on the 2003 Asian Dub Foundation album Enemy of the Enemy. O'Brien and Selway toured and recorded with Neil Finn as part of the 7 Worlds Collide project; O'Brien provided guitar and backing vocals on their 2001 live album and the 2009 studio album The Sun Came Out.

O'Brien is a founding director of the Featured Artists Coalition, a nonprofit organisation set up to protect the rights of featured musical artists, particularly in the digital age. He appeared on the 16 April 2011 episode of the BBC Radio 5 Live sports programme Fighting Talk in support of Record Shop Day.

O'Brien worked with Fender to design a signature model guitar, the EOB Stratocaster, which went on sale in November 2017. It features a tremolo bridge and a sustainer neck pickup.

In 2013, O'Brien cofounded the Laundry, a workspace, restaurant and nightclub converted from a laundry in London Fields. In 2019, Hackney Council announced that the building would be demolished to make way for luxury flats. In 2014, O'Brien and Selway signed an open letter protesting a ban on guitars in British prisons. In 2019, O'Brien joined the RSPB Let Nature Sing project, which aimed to get birdsong into the UK charts to raise awareness of the decline in Britain's birdlife. In 2020, O'Brien contributed to Ear Opener, an online video course aimed at helping young people write music. That November, he gave evidence to a DCMS Committee inquiry into the impact of streaming on the music industry. He said he wanted to speak for less successful artists, who he felt were "taken advantage of".

Musicianship

O'Brien said his role in Radiohead is to support the songwriter, Thom Yorke, and "service the songs". He said of his playing: "I literally learned to play my instrument within the band, so I started off very limited — and I'm still very limited. But I've been lucky, because I've been in a band that has not required you to be a virtuoso." In 2010, the Rolling Stone journalist David Fricke named O'Brien the 59th-greatest guitarist of all time. O'Brien also sings backing vocals, which Pitchfork described in 2006 as Radiohead's "most consistent secret weapon".

While Jonny Greenwood plays most of Radiohead's lead guitar parts, O'Brien often creates ambient effects, making extensive use of effects units. He said of the technique: "It's a bit like you're creating a canvas. That would be in accompaniment with Thom playing chords on the piano — you're building up a cloud of effects behind." O'Brien usually plays Fender Stratocasters, including an Eric Clapton Stratocaster. He also plays Gretsch and Rickenbacker guitars, including a twelve-string Rickenbacker. O'Brien said in 2017 that his most used effects are distortion, an Electro-Harmonix Memory Man delay and a DigiTech Whammy pitch shifter.

To create the high-pitched chiming sound that introduces "Lucky", O'Brien strums above the guitar nut. He creates the reverberating pops on the introduction of "2 + 2 = 5". On "Karma Police", O'Brien distorts his guitar by driving a delay effect to self-oscillation, then lowering the delay rate, creating a "melting" effect. "Treefingers", an ambient piece, was created by processing O'Brien's guitar loops. On "Dollars and Cents", O'Brien uses a pitch shifter pedal to shift his guitar chords from minor to major. For "All I Need", he used a sustain unit and a guitar strung with four bottom E strings, creating a thicker sound. O'Brien uses the EBow, an electronic sustaining device, on his guitar to generate drones and ambient leads on songs such as "My Iron Lung", "Talk Show Host", "Jigsaw Falling Into Place", "Where I End and You Begin" and "Nude". On the Radiohead albums The King of Limbs and A Moon Shaped Pool, he used a Klon Centaur overdrive pedal.

Influences 
O'Brien's earliest guitar influence was Andy Summers of the Police, particularly his use of delay and chorus effects on "Walking on the Moon". His other influences include Peter Buck of R.E.M, Paul Weller of the Jam, Johnny Marr of the Smiths, John McGeoch of Magazine and Siouxsie and the Banshees, and the Edge of U2. O'Brien admired how these guitarists created "space" rather than playing conventional solos. He said: "They were great guitarists, but they weren’t lead guitarists ... My favourite guitarists know when not to play. Then you make more of it when you do play. Make it count." O'Brien cited the American band Phish as an influence, saying: "It’s like a jazz band; they are willing to take risks for a moment of musical transcendence. That’s what I’m after — I want to tap into that."

Personal life
O'Brien lives in London and Wales with his wife Susan Kobrin, who worked for Amnesty International. The couple have a son, born in January 2004, and a daughter, born in 2006. O'Brien is a cricket fan and supports Brentford F.C. Around 2000, he gave up alcohol and took up meditation; he said: "[Alcohol] was fucking me up. I thought, 'I can carry on, or I can be a better person.'" In 2011, O'Brien and his family moved to Brazil for a year, living on a farm near Ubatuba. In March 2020, O'Brien announced that he had contracted COVID-19 and was recovering in isolation.

Solo discography

Studio albums

Singles

See also

 List of Old Abingdonians

References

Notes 
 

1968 births
Living people
Radiohead members
Alternative rock guitarists
Ivor Novello Award winners
People educated at Abingdon School
Rhythm guitarists
English rock guitarists
musicians from Oxford
English people of Irish descent